Muhammad Hafiz bin Abu Sujad (born 1 November 1990) is a former footballer who played in the Singapore Premier League and Malaysia Super League. He is a versatile player who can play in midfield or defence. He captained Young Lions, playing as a left-back prior to signing for LionsXII in 2013. With LionsXII, he began to play in more advanced positions in left and central midfield.

Club career

Young Lions
Hafiz began his professional football career with Under-23 side Young Lions in the S.League in 2009.

LionsXII
In December 2011, the FAS announced that Hafiz was to join the newly formed LionsXII for the 2012 Malaysia Super League.

Tampines Rovers
In 2016, Hafiz signed for Tampines Rovers for the 2016 S.League campaign after LionsXII was disbanded in 2015. He had a stellar season with the Stags, earning him a nomination for the 2016 S.League Player of the Season award. In December, Hafiz went to Thailand for trials with Thai League 2 sides BBCU F.C. and Sisaket F.C.

BBCU 
The 2017 season saw Hafiz seal a move to Thai Division 2 side BBCU F.C. on an initial one-year contract after he impressed on a trial there in December 2016.

Tampines Rovers 
After leaving BBCU, Hafiz had signed a deal to return to Tampines Rovers and will be wearing the no.18 shirt which had been vacated by fellow Singapore International, Yasir Hanapi who had moved to PDRM in Malaysia.

JDT II 
Hafiz next moved to Malaysia Premier League side JDT II for the 2018 season. Despite being on trial with Super League side Melaka United, Melaka opted for fellow Singapore international, Shahdan Sulaiman, instead, leaving Hafiz to seek a move to JDT II.

Return to Tampines 
Hafiz rejoins Tampines Rovers on Singapore Premier League deadline day for registration, 13 April 2018.

International career

Hafiz made his international debut on 16 October 2012, coming on as a substitute against India in a friendly match.

Personal life

Hafiz comes from a sporting family. His father, Abu Sujad is a former Singapore international left-back while his mother, Norija, is a housewife. His sister Nurhafizah, is a former national netballer and became the Lions' physiotherapist. His older brother Nadzi, played in the S.League player with Balestier Central.

Hafiz's uncle is Mat Noh, a Malaysia Cup winner with Singapore and his cousin is Fandi Ahmad, former Singapore national player and former interim head coach of the Singapore national football team.

Career statistics

Club

. Caps and goals may not be correct.

 Young Lions and LionsXII are ineligible for qualification to AFC competitions in their respective leagues.
 Young Lions withdrew from the 2011 and 2012 Singapore Cup, and the 2011 Singapore League Cup due to participation in AFC and AFF youth competitions.

International

Statistics accurate as of match played 5 March 2014

Honours

Club
LionsXII
Malaysia Super League: 2013 
Malaysia FA Cup: 2015

References

External links
 https://archive.today/20130927063138/http://www.lionsxii.sg/newsroom/details/id/166
http://th.soccerway.com/players/hafiz-abu-sujad/71544/

Living people
1990 births
Singaporean footballers
Singapore international footballers
Singaporean expatriate footballers
LionsXII players
Singapore Premier League players
Singaporean people of Malay descent
Association football defenders
Association football midfielders
Malaysia Super League players
Young Lions FC players
Southeast Asian Games bronze medalists for Singapore
Southeast Asian Games medalists in football
Competitors at the 2013 Southeast Asian Games